The following squads were named for the 1941 South American Championship that took place in Chile.

Argentina
 Juan Estrada
 Sebastián Gualco
 Jorge Alberti
 José Batagliero
 Sabino Coletta
 Bartolomé Colombo
 José Salomón
 Alberto Belén
 Gregorio Esperón
 Antonio Sastre
 Roberto Sbarra
 Eusebio Videla
 Gabino Arregui
 Luis Arrieta
 Enrique García
 Juan Marvezy
 José María Minella
 José Manuel Moreno
 Adolfo Pedernera

Chile
 Sergio Livingstone
 Roberto Cabrera
 Ascanio Cortés
 Oscar Ellis
 Segundo Flores
 Humberto Roa
 Luis Vidal
 Manuel Arancibia
 Osvaldo Carvajal
 Armando Contreras
 Alfonso Domínguez
 Juan Muñoz
 José Pastenes
 Oscar Sánchez
 Héctor Trejo
 José Avendaño
 Desiderio Medina
 Raúl Pérez
 David Ruíz
 Enrique Sorrel
 Raúl Toro

Ecuador
 Vicente Aguirre
 Marino Alcívar
 Clemente Angulo
 Ernesto Cevallos
 Luis Contreras
 Vicente Delgado
 César Augusto Freire
 Carlos Garnica
 Humberto Gavilanez
 José Herrera
 Luis Hungria
 Jorge Laurido
 Luis Antonio Mendoza
 José Merino
 Ignacio Molina
 José Peralta
 Enrique Raymondi Chávez
 Alfonso Romo
 Luis Santoliva
 Eduardo Stacey
 Alfonso Suárez Rizzo

Peru
 Gerardo Arce
 Vicente Arce
 Teodoro Fernández
 Alejandro González
 Juan Honores
 Marcial Hurtado
 Guillermo Janneau
 Orestes Jordán
 Máximo Lobatón
 Pedro Luna
 Adolfo Magallanes
 Pedro Magán
 Roberto Morales
 Enrique Perales
 Carlos Portal
 Leopoldo Quiñónez
 Juan Quispe
 César Socarraz
 Manuel Vallejas

Uruguay
 Anibal Paz
 Avelino Cadilla
 Sixto González
 Carlos Martínez
 Héctor Romero
 Obdulio Varela
 Schubert Gambetta
 Oscar Chirmini
 Héctor Magliano
 José María Medina
 Roberto Porta
 Juan Riephoff
 Ismael Rivero
 Bibiano Zapirain

References

Squads
Copa América squads